The 1998 Vuelta a Burgos was the 20th edition of the Vuelta a Burgos road cycling stage race, which was held from 10 August to 14 August 1998. The race started in Miranda de Ebro and finished in Burgos. The race was won by Abraham Olano of the  team.

General classification

References

Vuelta a Burgos
1998 in road cycling
1998 in Spanish sport